Jan Krist is an American singer-songwriter from Detroit, Michigan whose music is primarily folk. In 1993, Jan was a New Folk Finalist at the Kerville Music Festival for her songs titled "Someone" and "Daisies in a Bowl".  Jan is married to Alan Finkbeiner. Jan is a founding member of the Yellow Room Gang (YRG), a songwriting collective centered in South-East Michigan. She often performs with fellow YRG member Jim Bizer.

Discography 

 Decapitated Society, 1992
 Wing and a Prayer, 1992
 See Stone, EP
 Curious, 1996
 Outpost of the Counter-Culture, 2001
 Love Big Us Small
 Wounded Me, Wounded You, 2002
 When Planets Collide, 2004
 Fallow Ground, 2010

External links
 
 Jan Krist and Jim Bizer

American performers of Christian music
Living people
American women singer-songwriters
Singers from Detroit
Year of birth missing (living people)
Singer-songwriters from Michigan
21st-century American women